Philip Hubbard (born 1969, Ashford, Kent) is a British geographer. He is currently Professor of Urban Studies at King's College London, having previously served as the head of the School of Social Policy, Sociology, and Social Research, University of Kent. Hubbard has written widely cited work on urban sociology, urban geography, and social geographies.

Hubbard was previously editor of the journal Social & Cultural Geography, and chair of the Social and Cultural Geography Research Group of the Royal Geographical Society. Hubbard's work has principally focused on contested land uses in the city, and the resolution of social conflict via legal techniques of planning and licensing. This has combined Foucauldian theories of governmentality with insights derived from psychoanalytical and queer theory which focus on questions of disgust and exclusion. Hubbard has also written or co-edited a number of texts and collections on theory and philosophy in human geography. In 2017 he published a book on the retail gentrification of British cities, The Battle for The High Street, and in 2018 issued the second edition of his text City.

Hubbard is well known as a leading figure in the study of sexuality and space. His work has concentrated on issues around prostitution, and in particular the location, regulation, and impact of street prostitution and sexual entertainment venues in England, Wales, and Scotland. In 2015, Hubbard presented evidence to Scottish Parliament, calling for a unified approach to the licensing and regulation of sexual entertainment venues.

References 

English geographers
English sociologists
1969 births
Living people
Academics of the University of Kent
Academics of King's College London